Legions of the North is the seventh studio album by the Viking metal band Månegarm. It was released in 2013.

Track listing

Charts

References

External links
Månegarm's official website

Månegarm albums
2013 albums